A galaxy is an astronomical system that consists of a large number of stars and other matter.

Galaxy may also refer to:

Astronomy
The Milky Way, the galaxy containing the Earth's Sun, often referred to as just "The Galaxy"

People with the name
 Kaokor Galaxy, (born 1959), a Thai boxer and Khaosai's twin brother
 Khaosai Galaxy (born 1959), a Thai boxer and Kaokor's twin brother

Arts, entertainment, and media

Games
Galaxy Game, the second known coin-operated computer or video game, 1971
 Galaxy (video game), a 1981 computer game from Avalon Hill
Star Wars Galaxies, a 2003 online game
Super Mario Galaxy, a 2007 video game
Super Mario Galaxy 2, its sequel

Literature
 Galaxies, a 1980 book by Timothy Ferris
 The Galaxy ( The Milky Way), a 1929 novel by Susan Ertz
 Galaxy: The Prettiest Star, a 2022 graphic novel by Jadzia Axelrod

Music

Music businesses
Galaxy Records, record label
Galaxy Studios, a multi-complex recording studio and post-production facility in Mol, Belgium

Groups
Galaxy, a 2000s band including Emma McKenna and Katie Stelmanis
Galaxy, a 1980s band including Phil Fearon
 The Galaxy, a Dutch anonym duo that produces future bass on Yellow Claw's record label Barong Family

Albums, EPs, and soundtracks
Galaxy (Jeff Lorber Fusion album), 2012
Galaxy (Rockets album), 1980
Galaxy (War album)
Galaxies, a soundtrack by Kevin Braheny for the Hansen Planetarium show
Galaxies, an album by The Digital Age
The Galaxy, an EP by the Axe Murder Boyz

Songs
"Galaxies" (song), by synthpop band Owl City
"Galaxy" (Buck-Tick song), 2009
"Galaxy" (Jessica Mauboy song), featuring Stan Walker, 2011
"Galaxy" (Dannii Minogue song), released in 2017
"Galaxy Song" by Monty Python

Periodicals
Galaxy Science Fiction, American magazine published between 1950 and 1980, with a brief revival in 1994
The Galaxy (magazine), a 19th-century American monthly

Radio
Galaxy Birmingham, UK FM/DAB radio station
Galaxy Communications, a radio broadcasting company based in New York
Galaxy Digital, UK DAB radio station
Galaxy Manchester, UK FM/DAB radio station
Galaxy North East, UK FM/DAB radio station
Galaxy Scotland, UK FM/DAB radio station
Galaxy South Coast, UK FM/DAB radio station
Galaxy Yorkshire, UK FM/DAB radio station
The Galaxy Network, British radio network

Television
Galaxy (Australian television), broadcaster
Galaxy High, a 1986 American-Japanese science fiction animated series
Galaxy (UK TV channel), channel of British Satellite Broadcasting
Galaxy Television (Nigeria)

Other uses in arts, entertainment, and media
Galaxy Express 999, a manga
Galaxy National Book Awards, formerly the Galaxy British Book Awards
Galaxy Novels, their publishing venture

Brands and enterprises

Galaxy (chocolate), a brand of milk chocolate
Galaxy Entertainment Group, a hotels and casinos operator in Macau
Galaxy Research, an Australian market-research company
Galaxy Theatres, a US-based chain of movie theaters
Cineplex Entertainment (formerly Galaxy Entertainment, Inc.), Canadian cinema chain
Samsung Galaxy, line of mobile computing devices

Sports
Frankfurt Galaxy (ELF), an American-rules football team
Frankfurt Galaxy (NFL Europe), a defunct American-rules football team
LA Galaxy, an American soccer (football) club in Major League Soccer
The Galaxy (ATC), an Australian horse race
TS Galaxy F.C., a South African soccer (football) club

Technology
Galaxy (computational biology), a scientific workflow and data integration system
Galaxy (satellite), a family of communications satellites operated by Intelsat
Galaxy (spacecraft), a space station prototype
Galaxy, the code name for the Sun Microsystems' SPARCserver 600MP series of computers

Transportation

Aviation
C-5 Galaxy, a military cargo airplane
Galaxy Airlines (disambiguation)
Gulfstream G200, also known as IAI 1126 Galaxy, a twin-engine business jet

Land transport
Dawes Galaxy, a bicycle
Ford Galaxy, a motor vehicle

Ships 
, a cruiseferry operated by Silja Line
, offshore home of 1960s pirate radio station Wonderful Radio London
MV Galaxy, a former Celebrity Cruises ship now named Marella Explorer
, a US Navy ship

Other uses
Galaxy (shopping centre), in Szczecin, Poland
Galaxy, British LGBT youth associated with G&Y magazine
Galaxy Towers, a waterfront condominium complex in Guttenberg, New Jersey, U.S.
 The galaxy of a hyperreal number in mathematical non-standard analysis

See also
Galactic (disambiguation)
Galax (disambiguation)
Galaxi
Galaxia (disambiguation)
Galaxian (disambiguation)
Galaxie (disambiguation)
Gallaxy (musician)